Macrocypraea cervinetta, the little deer cowry, is a species of sea snail, a cowry, a marine gastropod mollusk in the family Cypraeidae, the cowries. 

Subspecies
 Macrocypraea cervinetta californica Lorenz, 2017
 Macrocypraea cervinetta cervinetta (Kiener, 1844)

Description
The shape of this cowry is elongated, its basic colour is light brown, with small whitish ocellated spots on the dorsum and dark brown apertural teeth. The dorsum shows also a few trasversal clearer bands and a longitudinal line.

Distribution
This species occurs in the Eastern Pacific Ocean from the Gulf of California to Peru including the Galapagos Islands. It is mainly encountered at low tide under corals and rocks.

References

 Lorenz F. & Hubert A. (2000) A guide to worldwide cowries. Edition 2. Hackenheim: Conchbooks. 584 pp
 A. Myra Keen - Sea shells of tropical West America: marine mollusks from Baja California to Peru - Stanford University Press, 1971

External links

 Kiener L.C. (1843-1850). Spécies général et iconographie des coquilles vivantes. Vol. 1. Famille des Enroulées. Genres Porcelaine (Cypraea), Linné, pp. 1-166, pl. 1-57
 Biolib
 
 Simone L.R.L. & Cavallari D.C. (2020). A new species of Macrocypraea (Gastropoda, Cypraeidae) from Trindade Island, Brazil, including phenotypic differentiation from remaining congeneric species. PLOS ONE. 15(1): e0225963

Cypraeidae
Gastropods described in 1843